Charles Cecil John Manners, 6th Duke of Rutland KG (16 May 1815 – 3 March 1888, in Belvoir Castle), styled Marquess of Granby before 1857, was an English Conservative politician.

Background and education
Manners was the third but eldest surviving son of John Manners, 5th Duke of Rutland and Lady Elizabeth Howard, daughter of Frederick Howard, 5th Earl of Carlisle. John Manners, 7th Duke of Rutland and Lord George Manners were his younger brothers. He was educated at Eton and Trinity College, Cambridge, earning an MA in 1835.

Political career

Entering politics as Member of Parliament for Stamford in 1837, Manners became known as a voluble, if not particularly talented, protectionist. He briefly held office as a Lord of the Bedchamber to Prince Albert from 1843 to 1846.
Following the resignation of Lord George Bentinck from the leadership of the protectionists in the House of Commons at the beginning of 1848, Granby (as he was then known) became the leader on 10 February 1848, as Benjamin Disraeli was unacceptable to Lord Derby, the overall leader of the party, and the majority of the rank and file. Granby resigned on 4 March 1848, feeling himself inadequate to the post, and the party functioned without an actual leader in the Commons for the remainder of the parliamentary session.

At the start of the next session, affairs were handled by the triumvirate of Granby, Disraeli, and J. C. Herries. This confusing arrangement ended with Granby's resignation in 1851. He also declined to join the First Derby Ministry in 1852, and was appointed Lord Lieutenant of Lincolnshire instead. Granby succeeded to the dukedom of Rutland on the death of his father in 1857. He was made a Knight of the Garter in 1867. He also succeeded his father as Lord Lieutenant of Leicestershire, which post he held until his death on 4 March 1888, at the age of 72.

Personal life
Rutland never married. He had cherished a passion for Mary Anne Ricketts, later Lady Forester, but his father forbade the two to marry. He was also devoted to Lady Miles, wife of Sir Philip Miles, and scandalised society by leaving her his 120 ft yacht, Lufra, in his will. 
He was succeeded in the dukedom by his brother John.

Notes

References

External links 
 

1815 births
1888 deaths
Alumni of Trinity College, Cambridge
106
Knights of the Garter
Leaders of the Conservative Party (UK)
Lord-Lieutenants of Leicestershire
Lord-Lieutenants of Lincolnshire
Granby, Charles Manners, Marquess of
Granby, Charles Manners, Marquess of
Granby, Charles Manners, Marquess of
Granby, Charles Manners, Marquess of
Granby, Charles Manners, Marquess of
Rutland, D6
Charles
British landowners
19th-century British businesspeople
People educated at Eton College